Dupuy may refer to:

Dupuy (surname)

Places
Dupuy, Quebec, a village in Abitibi Ouest
Saint-Julien-du-Puy, a commune in the French département of Tarn, Midi-Pyrénées region

See also
 Bache-Gabrielsen, a brand of cognac marketed as Dupuy in France
 Dupuis (surname)